Robat-e Sang (also Romanized as Robāt Sang) is a city and capital of Jolgeh Rokh District, Torbat-e Heydarieh County, Razavi Khorasan Province, Iran. At the 2006 census, its population was 1,344, in 384 families.

Location 
Robat-e Sang is a city in the plain of Rokh city of Torbat Heydariyeh, Khorasan Razavi province of Iran. This city is located at the intersection of Torbat Heydariyeh-Mashhad road and the old Fariman road to Kadkan (Neishabour). This city is located 35 km away from Torbat Heydariyeh.

References 

Populated places in Torbat-e Heydarieh County
Cities in Razavi Khorasan Province